Paravaigal Palavitham is a 1988 Indian Tamil-language masala film directed by Robert–Rajasekar. It stars Ramki and Nirosha. The film was released on 2 December 1988. The film was remade in Telugu as Chinnari Sneham.

Plot 

A group of friends in college dream of achieving success in life. However, each one of them face different set of problems with employment, family or finance that results in most of them leading an unhappy and tragic life showing the idealistic and dreamy college life is nowhere in touch with cruel and cold day-to-day reality with Janaki becoming a prostitute, Sekar becoming a gangster, Shiva becoming a marriage broker where he gets to make no use of his education, Rekha unable to find a groom due to her outspoken nature and high education, Raja being thrown out of job constantly due to his straightforwardness.  

Sekar and Janaki user their connections with the dark underbelly of life and fix the problem of all others and dying in the end, as a couple.

Cast 
Ramki as Sekar
Nirosha as Janaki
Janagaraj as Shiva
Tara as Rekha
Nassar as Raja
Sabitha Anand as Geetha
Thyagu as Ramesh
V. K. Ramasamy as Shiva's father
Kumarimuthu
Ganthimathi as Sekar's mother

Production 
Besides directing, Robert–Rajasekar also handled the cinematography.

Soundtrack 
The music was composed by S. A. Rajkumar, who also wrote the lyrics.

Release and reception 
Paravaigal Palavitham was released on 2 December 1988. The following week, The Indian Express panned the film and said, "It's only Janagaraj's excellent histrionics that comes as a saving grace".

References

External links 
 

1980s masala films
1980s Tamil-language films
1988 films
Films scored by S. A. Rajkumar